The 1989 World's Strongest Man was the 12th edition of World's Strongest Man and was won by Jamie Reeves from the United Kingdom. It was his first and only title after finishing third the previous year. Ab Wolders from the Netherlands finished second after finishing fourth the previous year, and Jón Páll Sigmarsson from Iceland finished third. The contest was held at San Sebastián, Spain.

Final results

References

External links
 Official site

World's Strongest
World's Strongest Man
1989 in Spain